Imperious Delirium is the thirteenth studio album released by Australian rock music group The Saints. With Marty Willson-Piper out of the band, The Saints were, for the first time, a trio. Chris Bailey played all the guitar accompaniments on the album.

Track listing 
All tracks composed by Chris Bailey; except where indicated
"Drunk in Babylon" - 3:43
"Declare War" - 3:58
"Trocadero" - 3:28
"Je Fuckin' T'Aime" - 3:08
"Other Side of the World" - 4:05
"So Close" - 3:17
"Getting Away with Murder" - 3:23
"Drowning" (The Saints) - 3:36
"Enough Is Never Enough" (The Saints) - 2:52
"Learning to Crawl" - 3:26
"War of Independence" - 4:58

Personnel
Chris Bailey – vocals, guitar and production
Casper Wijnberg – bass, sound engineering and production
Pete Wilkinson – drums

References

External links
 

Imperious Delirium
Imperious Delirium